Justice Hitchcock may refer to:

Henry Hitchcock (1792–1839), chief justice of the Alabama Supreme Court
Peter Hitchcock (1781–1853), associate justice and chief justice of the Supreme Court of Ohio